Andrew Adams (born October 28, 1992) is an American football safety for the Tennessee Titans of the National Football League (NFL). He played college football at Connecticut.

College career
Adams started 33 games throughout his college tenure including all 12 in 2014 and all 13 in 2015. He was one of four captains his senior year with the Huskies. He led the Huskies with 103 tackles, as well as adding three interceptions and seven passes defended in his final season as a Husky.

Professional career

New York Giants

2016
On May 1, 2016, the New York Giants signed Adams to a three-year, $1.62 million contract as an undrafted free agent.

On September 3, 2016, the New York Giants waived Adams as part of their final roster cuts, but signed him to their practice squad the following day. On September 23, 2016, Adams was promoted from practice squad to the active roster. On September 25, 2016, Adams made one tackle during a 29–27 loss against the Washington Redskins in Week 3. On October 3, 2016, Adams earned his first career start after starting free safety Darian Thompson suffered a foot injury and  backup Nat Berhe was inactive due to a concussion. He finished the Giants’ 24–10 loss at the Minnesota Vikings with six combined tackles and one pass deflection. On November 6, 2016, Adams collected a season-high nine combined tackles, deflected two passes, and made his first career interception during a 28–23 win against the Philadelphia Eagles in Week 9. Adams intercepted a pass by Eagles’ quarterback Carson Wentz, that was initially intended for wide receiver Dorial Green-Beckham, and returned it for a 19-yard gain in the first quarter. He finished his rookie season in 2016 with 46 combined tackles (31 solo), five pass deflections, and one interception in 14 games and 13 starts. He received an overall grade of 79.4 from Pro Football Focus, which was the second best grade among rookie safeties in 2016 behind Keanu Neal (80.8).

2017
During training camp, Adams competed to be a starting free safety against Darian Thompson. Head coach Ben McAdoo named Adams the backup free safety, behind Darian Thompson, to start the regular season. In Week 17, he collected a season-high seven solo tackles and deflected a pass during a 18–10 win against the Washington Redskins. On December 4, 2017, the New York Giants fired head coach Ben McAdoo after they fell to a 2–10 record. He finished the 2017 NFL season with 34 solo tackles and two pass deflections in 16 games and four starts.

2018
During training camp, Adams competed against Darian Thompson to be the starting free safety.
On September 1, 2018, the New York Giants officially waived Adams.

Tampa Bay Buccaneers
On September 26, 2018, the Tampa Bay Buccaneers signed Adams after placing Chris Conte on injured reserve. Head coach Dirk Koetter named Adams the backup free safety behind Jordan Whitehead. On December 2, 2018, Adams made one tackle, three pass deflections, and made a career-high three interceptions during a 24–17 victory against the Carolina Panthers. In Week 15, Adams collected a season-high seven combined tackles and deflected a pass as the Buccaneers lost 27–20 at the Dallas Cowboys. He finished the season with 38 combined tackles (29 solo), nine pass deflections, and four interceptions in 13 games and four starts.

Detroit Lions
On March 14, 2019, Adams signed a one-year contract with the Detroit Lions. He was released during final roster cuts on August 30, 2019.

Tampa Bay Buccaneers (second stint)

On September 10, 2019, Adams was signed by the Tampa Bay Buccaneers.
In Week 8 against the Tennessee Titans, Adams forced a fumble on Derrick Henry which was recovered by teammate Vernon Hargreaves in the 27–23 loss.
In Week 15 against his former team, the Detroit Lions, Adams recorded his first interception of the season off rookie quarterback David Blough during the 38–17 win. Overall, in the 2019 season, Adams recorded 45 total tackles, one interception, one forced fumble and three passes defensed in 14 games.

On March 24, 2020, Adams was re-signed to a one-year, $1 million contract. Adams played in all four games in the Buccaneers' playoff run that resulted in the team winning Super Bowl LV.

Philadelphia Eagles
On March 18, 2021, Adams signed a one-year contract with the Philadelphia Eagles. He was waived on August 31.

Tampa Bay Buccaneers (third stint)
On September 2, 2021, Adams rejoined the Buccaneers as a member of their practice squad and was signed to the active roster on September 13. He was hit on his helmet by his Coach Bruce Arians after their 31 - 15 playoff win.  He was trying to pull a player out of a scrum, Bruce later said, "No, I've seen enough dumb (things). You can't pull guys out of a pile. We just got a big play, great field position, and he's trying to pull a guy out of a pile."

New York Giants (second stint)
On July 26, 2022, the New York Giants signed Adams. On August 26, 2022, he was released.

Pittsburgh Steelers
On September 5, 2022, Adams was signed to the Pittsburgh Steelers practice squad.

Tennessee Titans
On September 21, 2022, Adams was signed by the Tennessee Titans off the Steelers practice squad. Adams returned an interception from quarterback Matt Ryan for his first career defensive touchdown in a 19-10 Week 7 win over the Indianapolis Colts.

NFL statistics

Buccaneers franchise records
Most interceptions in a game – 3 (tied with Ronde Barber and Aqib Talib) (December 2, 2018 vs Carolina Panthers)

Personal life
Adams is the nephew of retired guard, Sam Adams Sr. and cousins with his son, former defensive tackle Sam Adams. He is also the cousin of retired running back, Matt Forte. Adams' brother-in-law is linebacker Alec Ogletree.

References

External links
 Tampa Bay Buccaneers bio
 New York Giants bio
 Connecticut Huskies bio

1992 births
Living people
People from Fayetteville, Georgia
Sportspeople from the Atlanta metropolitan area
Players of American football from Georgia (U.S. state)
American football safeties
Woodward Academy alumni
UConn Huskies football players
New York Giants players
Tampa Bay Buccaneers players
Detroit Lions players
Philadelphia Eagles players
Pittsburgh Steelers players
Tennessee Titans players